John Langton may refer to:
 John Langton, 14th century Chancellor of England and Bishop of Chichester
John Langton (15th century MP) for Yorkshire
 John Langton (Bishop of St David's), (died 1447), 15th century Bishop of St Davids and Chancellor of the University of Cambridge
 John Langton (Canadian politician) (1808–1894), Canadian businessman, political figure and civil servant